Hurling Final can refer to a number of different hurling matches:

National
 The last match to be played in the All-Ireland Senior Hurling Championship
 The last match to be played in the All-Ireland Minor Hurling Championship
 The last match to be played in the All-Ireland Under-21 Hurling Championship

Leinster
 The last match to be played in the Leinster Senior Hurling Championship
 The last match to be played in the Leinster Minor Hurling Championship
 The last match to be played in the Leinster Under-21 Hurling Championship

Munster
 The last match to be played in the Munster Senior Hurling Championship
 The last match to be played in the Munster Minor Hurling Championship
 The last match to be played in the Munster Under-21 Hurling Championship

See also
 List of Interprovincial Hurling Championship finals